Hellenic is the branch of the Indo-European language family whose principal member is Greek. In most classifications, Hellenic consists of Greek alone, but some linguists use the term Hellenic to refer to a group consisting of Greek proper and other varieties thought to be related but different enough to be separate languages, either among ancient neighboring languages or among modern varieties of Greek.

Greek and ancient Macedonian
While the bulk of surviving public and private inscriptions found in ancient Macedonia were written in Attic Greek (and later in Koine Greek), fragmentary documentation of a vernacular local variety comes from onomastic evidence, ancient glossaries and recent epigraphic discoveries in the Greek region of Macedonia, such as the Pella curse tablet. This local variety is usually classified by scholars as a dialect of Northwest Doric Greek, and occasionally as an Aeolic Greek dialect or a distinct sister language of Greek; due to the latter classification, a family under the name "Hellenic" has been suggested to group together Greek proper and the ancient Macedonian language.

Modern Hellenic languages
In addition, some linguists use the term "Hellenic" to refer to modern Greek in a narrow sense together with certain other, divergent modern varieties deemed separate languages on the basis of a lack of mutual intelligibility. Separate language status is most often posited for Tsakonian, which is thought to be uniquely a descendant of Doric rather than Attic Greek, followed by Pontic and Cappadocian Greek of Anatolia. The Griko or Italiot varieties of southern Italy are also not readily intelligible to speakers of standard Greek. Separate status is sometimes also argued for Cypriot, though this is not as easily justified. In contrast, Yevanic (Jewish Greek) is mutually intelligible with standard Greek but is sometimes considered a separate language for ethnic and cultural reasons. Greek linguistics traditionally treats all of these as dialects of a single language.

Language tree

Classification
Hellenic constitutes a branch of the Indo-European language family. The ancient languages that might have been most closely related to it, ancient Macedonian (either an ancient Greek dialect or a separate Hellenic language) and Phrygian, are not documented well enough to permit detailed comparison. Among Indo-European branches with living descendants, Greek is often argued to have the closest genetic ties with Armenian (see also Graeco-Armenian) and Indo-Iranian languages (see Graeco-Aryan).

See also
Ancient Greek dialects
Varieties of Modern Greek

Notes

References

 
Indo-European languages
Greek language